The following is a list of gangsta rap artists.

0–9

11/5
187 Fac
213
21 Savage
3X Krazy
40 Glocc
50 Cent

A

Above the Law
AMG
AZ
Ant Banks

B

Bone Thugs-n-Harmony
Boo-Yaa T.R.I.B.E.
Boss
Bun B
Bushwick Bill

C

Chief Keef
Cold 187um (aka Big Hutch)
Comethazine
Compton's Most Wanted
Cypress Hill

D

Detroit's Most Wanted
Daz Dillinger
DJ Quik
Do or Die
Doggy's Angels
Dr. Dre

E

E-40
Eazy-E

G

The Game
Geto Boys
Freddie Gibbs

H

Hard Boyz
Havoc & Prodeje

I

Ice Cube
Ice-T

J

Ja Rule
Just-Ice

K

Knight Owl
Kurupt

L
Lunasicc

M

Mac Dre
Mack 10
Master P
MC Eiht
MC Ren
Mobb Deep
Mr. Serv-On

N

N.W.A
N2Deep
Nardo Wick
Nate Dogg
The Notorious B.I.G.

P
Pimp C

S

Scarface
Schoolboy Q
Schoolly D
Tupac Shakur
Skee-Lo
Snoop Dogg
South Central Cartel
South Park Mexican
Spice 1

Sidhu Moose Wala

T

Tay-K
Tha Dogg Pound
Too Short
TRU

Three 6 Mafia

U
UGK

W

Warren G
Westside Connection
WC
WC and the Maad Circle

X
X-Raided

Y
Ya Boy

Z
Z-Ro

References

Bibliography

 
Gangsta rap
Gangsta rap